

Va 

 William Berrian Vail b. 1823 first elected in 1874 as Liberal member for Digby, Nova Scotia.
 Cyrille Émile Vaillancourt b. 1848 first elected in 1891 as Nationalist member for Dorchester, Quebec.
 Georges-J. Valade b. 1922 first elected in 1958 as Progressive Conservative member for Sainte-Marie, Quebec.
 Bernard Valcourt b. 1952 first elected in 1984 as Progressive Conservative member for Madawaska—Victoria, New Brunswick.
 Rechie Valdez first elected in 2021 as Liberal member for Mississauga—Streetsville, Ontario. 
 Tony Valeri b. 1957 first elected in 1993 as Liberal member for Lincoln, Ontario.
Frank Valeriote b. 1954 first elected in 2008 as Liberal member for Guelph, Ontario. 
 Pierre Vincent Valin b. 1827 first elected in 1878 as Conservative member for Montmorency, Quebec.
 John Vallance b. 1883 first elected in 1925 as Liberal member for South Battleford, Saskatchewan.
 Roch Pamphile Vallée b. 1848 first elected in 1878 as Conservative member for Portneuf, Quebec.
 Roger Valley b. 1957 first elected in 2004 as Liberal member for Kenora, Ontario.
 Philippe Valois b. 1907 first elected in 1949 as Liberal member for Argenteuil—Deux-Montagnes, Quebec.
 Tony Van Bynen b. 1950 first elected in 2019 as Liberal member for Newmarket—Aurora, Ontario. 
 Walter Van De Walle b. 1922 first elected in 1986 as Progressive Conservative member for Pembina, Alberta.
 Joseph Charles Van Horne b. 1921 first elected in 1955 as Progressive Conservative member for Restigouche—Madawaska, New Brunswick.
 Adam van Koeverden b. 1982 first elected in 2019 as Liberal member for Halton, Ontario. 
 Peter Van Loan b. 1963 first elected in 2004 as Conservative member for York—Simcoe, Ontario.
 Dave Van Kesteren b. 1955 first elected in 2006 as Conservative member for Chatham-Kent—Essex, Ontario. 
 Tako Van Popta b. 1953 first elected in 2019 as Conservative member for Langley—Aldergrove, British Columbia.
 Fabien Vanasse b. 1850 first elected in 1879 as Conservative member for Yamaska, Quebec.
 Lyle Vanclief b. 1943 first elected in 1988 as Liberal member for Prince Edward—Hastings, Ontario.
 Dan Vandal b. 1960 first elected in 2015 as Liberal member for Saint Boniface—Saint Vital, Manitoba.
 Anita Vandenbeld b. 1971 first elected in 2015 as Liberal member for Ottawa West—Nepean, Ontario.
 William John Vankoughnet b. 1943 first elected in 1979 as Progressive Conservative member for Hastings—Frontenac, Ontario.
 Adam Vaughan b. 1961 first elected in 2014 as Liberal member for Trinity—Spadina, Ontario. 
 Angela Vautour b. 1960 first elected in 1997 as New Democratic Party member for Beauséjour—Petitcodiac, New Brunswick.

Ve 
 Karen Vecchio b. 1971 first elected in 2015 as Conservative member for Elgin—Middlesex—London, Ontario.
 Michel Veillette b. 1939 first elected in 1979 as Liberal member for Champlain, Quebec.
 Maurice Vellacott b. 1955 first elected in 1997 as Reform member for Wanuskewin, Saskatchewan.
 Clarence Joseph Veniot b. 1886   first elected in 1936 as Liberal member for Gloucester, New Brunswick.
 Peter John Veniot b. 1863 first elected in 1926 as Liberal member for Gloucester, New Brunswick.
 Pierrette Venne b. 1945 first elected in 1988 as Progressive Conservative member for Saint-Hubert, Quebec.
 Josée Verner b. 1959 first elected in 2006 as Conservative member for Louis-Saint-Laurent, Quebec. 
 Harry Verran b. 1930 first elected in 1993 as Liberal member for South West Nova, Nova Scotia.
 Alphonse Verville b. 1864 first elected in 1906 as Labour member for Maisonneuve, Quebec.
 Joseph-Achille Verville b. 1887 first elected in 1925 as Liberal member for Lotbinière, Quebec.
 Monique Vézina b. 1935   first elected in 1984 as Progressive Conservative member for Rimouski—Témiscouata, Quebec.

Vi 

 Fernand Viau b. 1909 first elected in 1945 as Liberal member for St. Boniface, Manitoba.
 Gary Vidal b. 1965 first elected in 2019 as Conservative member for Desnethé—Missinippi—Churchill River, Saskatchewan. 
 Dominique Vien b. 1967 first elected in 2021 as Conservative member for Bellechasse—Les Etchemins—Lévis, Quebec. 
 Jacques Vien b. 1932 first elected in 1988 as Progressive Conservative member for Laurentides, Quebec.
 Thomas Vien b. 1881 first elected in 1917 as Laurier Liberal member for Lotbinière, Quebec.
 Arnold Viersen b. 1986 first elected in 2015 as Conservative member for Peace River—Westlock, Alberta. 
 Julie Vignola first elected in 2019 as Bloc Québécois member for Beauport—Limoilou, Quebec.
 René Villemure first elected in 2021 as Bloc Québécois member for Trois-Rivières, Quebec. 
 Georges Villeneuve b. 1922 first elected in 1953 as Liberal member for Roberval, Quebec.
 Osie Villeneuve b. 1906   first elected in 1957 as Progressive Conservative member for Glengarry—Prescott, Ontario.
 Auguste Vincent b. 1915 first elected in 1953 as Liberal member for Longueuil, Quebec.
 Clément Vincent b. 1931 first elected in 1962 as Progressive Conservative member for Nicolet—Yamaska, Quebec.
 Pierre H. Vincent b. 1955 first elected in 1984 as Progressive Conservative member for Trois-Rivières, Quebec.
 Robert Vincent b. 1956 first elected in 2004 as Bloc Québécois member for Shefford, Quebec.
 Arif Virani b. 1973 first elected in 2015 as Liberal member for Parkdale—High Park, Ontario.
 Brad Vis b. 1984 first elected in 2019 as Conservative member for Mission—Matsqui—Fraser Canyon, British Columbia.
 Reginald Percy Vivian b. 1902 first elected in 1957 as Progressive Conservative member for Durham, Ontario.

Vo 

 Joseph Volpe b. 1947 first elected in 1988 as Liberal member for Eglinton—Lawrence, Ontario.

Vr 

 Adam Edward Vrooman b. 1847 first elected in 1900 as Conservative member for Victoria South, Ontario.

Vu
Kevin Vuong first elected in 2021 as Liberal member for Spadina—Fort York, Ontario.

V